Metro Stare Bielany became the 19th working station on Line M1 of the Warsaw Metro when it opened on 25 October 2008 as part of the extension from Słodowiec to Młociny. It had been under construction since June, 2006. Originally, the station was to be called Bielany. The station is distinctive due to a series of wooden relief sculptures on the walls.

References

External links

Railway stations in Poland opened in 2008
Line 1 (Warsaw Metro) stations
Bielany